This article is the discography of American singer-songwriter and musician Suzi Quatro.

Albums

Studio albums

Live albums

Compilation albums

Video albums

Singles

See also 
 List of songs recorded by Suzi Quatro

Notes

References 

Discographies of American artists
Rock music discographies